Justin Bieber (born 1994) is a Canadian singer.

Bieber may also refer to:
 Bieber (surname)

Organizations
 Bieber Transportation Group, defunct bus company based in Kutztown, Pennsylvania

Places
 Offenbach-Bieber, Germany, a borough of Offenbach am Main
 Bieber, Biebergemünd, Germany
 Bieber, California, United States, a census-designated place
 Bieber Bench, an upland area in the Ross Dependency of Antarctica

Rivers
 Bieber (Haune), a river in Hesse, Germany
 Bieber (Kinzig), a river in Hesse, Germany
 Bieber (Lahn), a river in Hesse, Germany
 Bieber (Rodau), a river in Hesse, Germany

See also
Beber (disambiguation)
Biber (disambiguation)